The  of Japan provides for the designation of three types of protected area:  and , by the Minister of the Environment, and , by Prefectural Governors.

Wilderness Areas
As of 31 March 2015, five Wilderness Areas have been designated, with a total area of 56.31 km2.

Nature Conservation Areas
As of 31 March 2015, ten Nature Conservation Areas have been designated, with a total area of 225.42 km2.

Prefectural Nature Conservation Areas
As of 31 March 2015, five hundred and forty-four Prefectural Nature Conservation Areas have been designated, with a total area of 774.08 km2.

 Miyazaki: ・
 Kagoshima: ・
 Okinawa: ・・・・・・・・・・

See also
 Wildlife of Japan
 National Parks of Japan
 Wildlife Protection Areas in Japan
 Natural Habitat Conservation Areas in Japan
 Environmental issues in Japan

References

External links
 Protected areas in Japan (Ministry of the Environment)
 Wilderness Areas and Nature Conservation Areas (Ministry of the Environment)
  Nature Conservation Areas (Ministry of the Environment)

Protected areas of Japan